U Save Automatic (also known as USA Gasoline or USA Petroleum) is an American oil company which operates in the United States. It was founded as Skypower Gasoline by Peter Moller and his sons Poul, Finn and John and changed the name to USA Gasoline in 1968. USA Gasoline operates in 10 states, including Alaska, California, Colorado, Idaho, Nevada, New Mexico, Oregon, Utah, Washington, and Wyoming.  It became a subsidiary of Tesoro Corporation in 2007, later renamed Andeavor in 2017, which was, in turn, acquired by Marathon Petroleum in 2018.

History
1970s
In the 1970s, USA Gasoline became the first gasoline retailer to experiment with self-service pay at the pump technology and entered into an agreement with Allstate Bank of Southern California allowing banking customers to automatically debit their accounts directly from the pump.

Over the course of 1975 and 1976, all UCO stations became USA Gasoline stations.
Over the course of 1976-1977, all Sears stations became USA Gasoline stations.

1980s + 1990s
From 1988 to 1990, USA Petroleum was involved in a lawsuit with ARCO due to fuel prices.
in 1992, USA Petroleum moved its headquarters from Santa Monica to Ventura.
in 1993, their headquarters were moved again, this time from Ventura to Agoura Hills.
in 1994, Marvin Jay Caukin, the ex-Director of Finance, was sentenced 33 months in prison for embezzling nearly $2.4 million from the company.

2000s
in 2003, USA Petroleum agreed to pay $325,000 to settle a dispute regarding leaking tanks causing groundwater and soil pollution at 10 USA Gasoline stations in Ventura County.
in July 2006, USA Petroleum announced its plan to sell 122 of its California gas stations to Chevron.  The deal was finalized in November.
in 2007, Tesoro Corp acquired USA Gasoline, and approximately 140 retail stations.

2010s
in 2011, 51 Albertsons Express stores rebranded as USA Gasoline. As part of the deal, all Mirastar stations (which were typically located outside select Walmart locations) were also rebranded as USA Gasoline.
in 2012, 250 ARCO (Thrifty-style stations) and Thrifty Oil stations rebranded as USA Gasoline, because BP did not renew the leases for 250 ARCO or Thrifty stations.
In 2019, after the acquisition of USA Gasoline’s parent company Andeavor by Marathon Petroleum, many USA Gasoline locations were (as of 2020) in the process of being rebranded to Marathon's now-former subsidiary, Speedway.

See also

References

Gas stations in the United States
Oil companies of the United States
Petroleum in California
Retail companies based in California
Companies based in Agoura Hills, California
American companies established in 1968
Energy companies established in 1968
Non-renewable resource companies established in 1968
Retail companies established in 1968
1968 establishments in California
2007 mergers and acquisitions
American corporate subsidiaries
Marathon Petroleum